Weyerhaeuser Real Estate Company (WRECO) was a home construction and real-estate developer. WRECO was formed in 1969 as a subsidiary of Weyerhaeuser. It constructed homes under the names  
Quadrant Homes (greater Seattle and Puget Sound area), Pardee Homes (California and Nevada), Maracay Homes (Arizona), Trendmaker Homes, Avanti Custom Homes, Texas Casual Cottages (Texas), Winchester Homes, Camberley Homes, and Everson Homes (Maryland and Virginia). Weyerhaeuser Realty Investors (WRI) provided capital to other builders. In 2014, the company was acquired by Tri Pointe Homes.

References

1969 establishments in Washington (state)
American companies established in 1969
Construction and civil engineering companies established in 1969

Construction and civil engineering companies of the United States 
Federal Way, Washington
Real estate companies established in 1969
Weyerhaeuser